Momordica is a genus of about 60 species of annual or perennial climbers herbaceous or rarely small shrubs belonging to the family Cucurbitaceae, natives of tropical and subtropical Africa and Asia and Australia. Most species produce floral oils and are visited by specialist pollinators in the apid tribe Ctenoplectrini. A molecular phylogeny that includes all species is available (Schaefer and Renner, 2010).

Cultivation and uses
Some Momordica species are grown in cultivation for their fleshy fruit, which are oblong to cylindrical in shape, orange to red in colour, prickly or warted externally, and in some species burst when ripe, generally with elastic force, into irregular valves.

Momordica can be cultivated in 5 litre vases or jardinière and is hardly susceptible to plagues. After seeding, Momordica develops leaves in about 11 days and flowers after 40 to 50 days. After fertilisation, the Momordica fruit will be developed in about 10 days.

Momordica charantia (bitter melon, Mandarin Chinese: kǔ guā 苦瓜) is native to Africa but has been used in Chinese folk medicine for centuries as a 'bitter, cold' herb, and has recently been brought into mainstream Chinese medicine as well as natural medical traditions around the world. Recent research has shown that the immature fruit might have some antibiotic, anticancer, and antiviral properties, particularly well suited for use in treatment of malaria, HIV, and diabetic conditions. The use of Momordica fruit is contraindicated in a number of conditions, especially pregnancy.

Accepted species

List sources

References
 
 

 
Cucurbitaceae genera
Medicinal plants
Taxa named by Carl Linnaeus